Canta is a town in the Lima Region, in western Peru. The town is located on the Chillón River and is the capital of the Canta Province. With a population of 2,385 (2017 census), it is also the capital of Canta District. It is frequently visited by tourists from Lima because of its quietness and the beauty of its natural landscapes. The town's altitude is 2,819 m above sea level.

Etymology
The word canta comes from the Cauqui language spoken by the ancient inhabitants and their meaning can be indicated with these two meanings:
 canta = tie to catch vicunas
 canta = hillside, decline

Geography
The small town of Obrajillo is nearby.

History
At some time in the 16th century, it was dominated by the Inca Pachacutec during his path to the north. The Spanish conquistadors found Canta in a prosperous locality. It was given like a parcel to don Nicolás de Ribera. During the campaign for the Independence from the Spanish crown, its people had given strong support to the cause of liberation. For that, in 1839 it was declared "heroic village".

References

External links
  La Viuda myth
  Cantamarca, archaeological site

Populated places in the Lima Region